The Borough of Slough is a borough with unitary authority status in the ceremonial county of Berkshire, Southern England. The borough is centred around the town of Slough and includes Langley. It forms an urban area with parts of Buckinghamshire and extends to the villages of Burnham, Farnham Royal, George Green, and Iver. Part of the district's area was in Buckinghamshire prior to the district's formation and in Middlesex until 1965.

History 
The borough was formed on 1 April 1974 under the Local Government Act 1972 from the Municipal Borough of Slough and parts of the parishes of Burnham and Wexham of which were formerly in Eton Rural District in Buckinghamshire. On 1 April 1995 the parish of Colnbrook with Poyle was transferred to Slough.

Geography
The borough borders the counties of Buckinghamshire (the UA of the same name), Greater London (Hillingdon) and Surrey (Spelthorne), as well as the Royal Borough of Windsor and Maidenhead (also in Berkshire). Notable settlements nearby including London, Reading and High Wycombe. The borough has good links to London and other towns and cities with its main connecting road being the M4 Motorway. It is also served by six railway stations: Taplow, Burnham, Slough, Langley, Iver and West Drayton. The district contains the unparished area of Slough and the civil parish of Colnbrook with Poyle. The parishes of Britwell and Wexham Court were scheduled for abolition in April 2019, but after an appeal by the parish councils and a judicial review the order was quashed and the parishes remain unchanged.

Council and cabinet

Wards
The borough comprises 15 wards:

 Baylis and Stoke (Pop; 9,701)
 Britwell and Northborough (Pop; 10,686)
 Central (Pop; 11,482)
 Chalvey (Pop; 13,183)
 Cippenham Green (Pop; 9,969)
 Cippenham Meadows (Pop; 11,891)
 Colnbrook with Poyle (Pop; 6,588)
 Elliman (Pop; 10,435)
 Farnham (Pop; 10,988)
 Foxborough (Pop; 3,724)
 Haymill and Lynch Hill (Pop; 9,525)
 Langley Kedermister (Pop; 10,355)
 Langley St Mary's (Pop; 11,157)
 Upton (Pop; 9,305)
 Wexham Lea (Pop; 10,588)

References

External links

 
 Slough Borough Council
Slough History Online

 
Districts of Berkshire
Unitary authority districts of England
Boroughs in England